"Signs" is the 11th single by the rock band, Cardiacs, released in 1999. The song is from the album, Guns, while the other tracks on the single are exclusive to this release. The original mix of "Dog Like Sparky" is available on the Sing to God album.

Track listing
 "Signs"
 "Sang 'All Away Away!'"
 "Dog Like Sparky" (Instrumental)

Lineup
 Tim Smith – lead vocals and guitar
 Jim Smith – bass guitar and vocals
 Jon Poole – guitar
 Bob Leith – drums

References

Cardiacs songs
1999 singles
1999 songs
Songs written by Tim Smith (Cardiacs)